At 251 metres, Ball Hill is one of the highest hills in the county of Dorset, England, and is on the Wessex Ridgeway.

Location 
The summit of Ball Hill lies at the eastern end of a short ridge running from east to west. Its lower, western end is known as Church Hill. To the south a short spur drops steeply to the hamlet of Plush in Watcombe Bottom. To the north the land descends more gradually to the vale of Lydden. The hill is about 4 kilometres southeast of Buckland Newton, 6 kilometres west-northwest of Cerne Abbas and 9 kilometres west of Milton Abbas. Other prominent hills in the vicinity include Lyscombe Hill (261 m) to the southeast on the other side of the hamlet of Folly.

History 
There is evidence of prehistoric settlement on almost every hill in the vicinity,  with a hill fort on Nettlecombe Tout (a spur of Lyscombe Hill) to the east, cross dykes and tumuli on the flanks of Lyscombe Hill to the southeast and a tumulus and field system on Church Hill to the west.

References 

Hills of Dorset